Marian Hall Seldes (August 23, 1928 – October 6, 2014) was an American actress. A five-time Tony Award nominee, she won the Tony Award for Best Featured Actress in a Play for A Delicate Balance in 1967, and received subsequent nominations for Father's Day (1971), Deathtrap (1978–82), Ring Round the Moon (1999), and Dinner at Eight (2002). She also won a Drama Desk Award for Father's Day.

Her other Broadway credits include Equus (1974–77), Ivanov (1997), and Deuce (2007). She was inducted into the American Theater Hall of Fame in 1995 and received the Special Tony Award for Lifetime Achievement in 2010.

Early life
Seldes was born in Manhattan, the daughter of Alice Wadhams Hall, a socialite, and Gilbert Seldes, a journalist, author, and editor. Her uncle was journalist George Seldes. She had one brother, Timothy. Seldes's paternal grandparents were Russian-Jewish immigrants, and her mother was from a "prominent WASP family," the "Episcopalian blue-blooded Halls." She grew up in a creative environment, studying acting at the Neighborhood Playhouse. Her maternal aunt, Marian Wells Hall, was a prominent interior decorator.

Career
Trained for the stage, Seldes made her Broadway debut in 1948 in a production of Medea. She went on to an illustrious career in which she earned five Tony Award nominations, winning her first time out in 1967 for A Delicate Balance. In addition to performing in live theatre, Seldes began acting in television in 1952 in a Hallmark Hall of Fame production that marked the first of many guest star roles. She also performed in a number of movies and in radio plays. In the mid-1960s, Seldes recorded five albums for Folkways Records of famous works of literature, including two recordings of poetry by Robinson Jeffers. Between 1974 and 1982, she appeared in 179 episodes of the CBS Radio Mystery Theater. In 1992, she appeared in an episode of Murphy Brown as the title character’s eccentric Aunt Brooke.

Seldes studied with Sanford Meisner, Katharine Cornell, and Martha Graham. Actor Laura Linney said "Marian is our touchstone to those theatrical ancestors. She provides an inspiration that makes you want to reach outside of yourself to something more potent and powerful." Seldes was a member of the drama faculty of The Juilliard School from 1967 to 1991. Her students included Christopher Reeve, Robin Williams, Kelsey Grammer, Kevin Kline, William Hurt, Patti LuPone, Val Kilmer, and Kevin Spacey. In 2002, Seldes began teaching at Fordham University, Lincoln Center.

Seldes appeared in every one of the 1,809 Broadway performances of Ira Levin's play Deathtrap, a feat that earned her a mention in the Guinness Book of World Records as "most durable actress". Seldes was also well known for her readings of short stories in the "Selected Shorts" series hosted by Isaiah Sheffer at New York City's Symphony Space.

In December 2008, for their annual birthday celebration to "The Master", Noël Coward, the Noël Coward Society invited Seldes as the guest celebrity to lay flowers in front of Coward's statue at New York's Gershwin Theatre, thereby commemorating the playwright’s 109th birthday. Seldes was the recipient of a 2010 Tony Lifetime Achievement Award. "All I've done is live my life in the theater and loved it ... If you can get an award for being happy, that's what I've got."

In 2012, Seldes played the knife-wielding socialite Mabel Billingsly in the film adaptation of Wendy Mass' popular children's book Jeremy Fink and the Meaning of Life, written and directed by Tamar Halpern.

Personal life
Seldes had one child, Katharine, by her first marriage to Julian Claman. They were divorced in 1961. Seldes stated that the marriage to Claman was violent. "If I sound a little vague about that marriage, it's because I don't understand the person in it. Me. I literally didn't know that people could be abusive." Seldes left the marriage after her father noticed marks on her face. Seldes was married to screenwriter/playwright Garson Kanin from 1990 until his death in 1999.

Death
Seldes died at age 86 on October 6, 2014 in Manhattan.

The cause of her death was not released. However, in 2017, it was reported that a documentary about her life, Marian, by director R.E. "Rick" Rodgers, chronicling Seldes' last years, had created "consternation in the theater world" as a "horrific, intrusive depiction of her slide into dementia".

Partial listing of her work

Theatre

Ondine (1954)
The Chalk Garden (1955)
The Milk Train Doesn't Stop Here Anymore (1964)
Tiny Alice (1964)
A Delicate Balance (1966)
Before You Go (1968)
Mercy Street (1969)
Equus (1974)
Deathtrap (1978)
Painting Churches (1983)
Gertrude Stein and a Companion (1986)
Three Tall Women (1993)
Ivanov (1998)
The Haunting (1999)
The Torch-Bearers (2000)
The Play About the Baby (2001)
45 Seconds from Broadway (2001)
Dinner at Eight (2003 revival)
Deuce (2007)
La fille du régiment (2008)

Television

Our Sister Emily (TV movie): Played Emily Brontë (1950) (television debut)
Sure As Fate (TV showcase): Played Lady Macduff in Macbeth (1951)
Westinghouse Studio One: Played Bell Giles in "The Laugh Maker" (1953)
Gunsmoke: Played Mrs. Cullen in "Indian White" (1956)
Have Gun – Will Travel: Played Christie Smith in "The Bride" (1957), and Mollie Stanton in "The Teacher" (1958)
Perry Mason: Played Mary K. Davis in "The Case of the Screaming Woman" (1958)
The Court of Last Resort: Played Roberta Farrell in "The Frank Clark Case" (1958), and Mary Morales in "The Mary Morales Case" (1958)
Half Hour to Kill: Played Joyce Field. Half Hour to Kill was a proposed but unrealized television series mystery show with episodes hosted by Vincent Price and planned to occasionally star him as well. Released to the home movie market as Freedom to Get Lost, with Price playing scientist Gene Wolcott and Seldes playing an undercover security agent tracking him. The episode is available on the DVD titled Vincent Price – The Sinister Image. (1958)
Alfred Hitchcock Presents: Played Lydia Brailing in "Design For Loving" (1958)
The Rifleman: Played two roles, a saucy woman named Hazel and, in the sick son's fevered delirium, the spirit of widower Lucas McCain's wife and Mark McCain's mother (Margaret), in "The Vision" (1960)
Branded: Played Neela, an Indian housekeeper, in "The Bar Sinister" (1965)
Law & Order: Played Suzanne in "God Bless the Child" (1991)
Murder, She Wrote: Played Lydia Winthrop in "The Witch's Curse" (1992)
Murphy Brown: Played Murphy's Aunt Brooke in "I'm Dreaming of a Brown Christmas" (1992)
Wings: Played Eleanor Kingsbury in "Death Becomes Him" (1995)
One Life to Live: Played Dorian Lord's mother (1998)
Cosby: Played Elaine in "One Foot in Your Mouth" (1996), and Virginia in "The Greatest Gift" (1998)
Sex and the City: Guest-starred as Mr. Big's mother Mrs. Big in "Oh Come All Ye Faithful" (1998)
A Nero Wolfe Mystery: Portrayed Mrs. Robilotti in "Champagne for One" (2001), and Mrs. Pitcairn in "Door to Death" (2001)
Frasier: Played Betty, Ronee's mother (Wendie Malick), in "Miss Right Now" (2004)
Law & Order: Special Victims Unit: Played Peggy Kendall in "Haystack" (2007)

Films

The Light in the Forest (1958)
Crime and Punishment U.S.A. (1959)
The Big Fisherman (1959)
The Greatest Story Ever Told (1965)
Fingers (1978)
The Gun in Betty Lou's Handbag (1992)
Truman (1995)
Tom and Huck (1995)
Tell the Truth and Run: George Seldes and the American Press (1996) documentary, as herself
Affliction (1997)
Home Alone 3 (1997)
Digging to China (1997)
The Haunting (1999)
If These Walls Could Talk 2 (2000)
Duets (2000)
Town & Country (2001)
Mona Lisa Smile (2003)
Proteus (2004), narrator
Ballets Russes (2005), narrator
August Rush (2007) as Dean Alice McNeille
The Visitor (2007)
Leatherheads (2008)
The Extra Man (2010)

Discography
The Roan Stallion by Robinson Jeffers (1963)
The Making of Americans by Gertrude Stein (1963
Theodore Bikel: "Songs of Songs" and other Bible Prophecies featuring Marian Seldes as Shulamite (1964))
Tower Beyond Tragedy by Robinson Jeffers (1964)
Phèdre by Jean Racine (1964)
Prayers from the Ark: French and English Poems (1964)

Radio
Theatre Guild on the Air: Played Julia in 1984 (1953)
CBS Radio Mystery Theater (appeared in 206 episodes)

Awards and nominations
Awards
1964 Obie Award for Distinguished Performance: The Ginger Man
1967 Tony Award for Best Featured Actress in a Play: A Delicate Balance
1971 Drama Desk Award for Outstanding Performance: Father's Day
1983 Outer Circle Critics Award for Best Actress in a Play: Painting Churches
2001 Obie Award for Sustained Achievement
2010 Tony Lifetime Achievement Award

Nominations
1971 Tony Award for Best Actress in a Play: Father's Day
1978 Tony Award for Best Featured Actress in a Play: Deathtrap
1998 Drama Desk Award for Outstanding Featured Actress in a Play: Ivanov
1999 Drama Desk Award for Outstanding Featured Actress in a Play: Ring Round the Moon
1999 Tony Award for Best Actress in a Play: Ring Round the Moon
2001 Drama Desk Award for Outstanding Featured Actress in a Play: The Butterfly Collection
2001 Drama Desk Award for Outstanding Actress in a Play: The Play About the Baby
2003 Tony Award for Best Featured Actress in a Play: Dinner at Eight
2006 Drama Desk Award for Outstanding Featured Actress in a Play: Dedication or The Stuff of Dreams

References

External links

 
 
 

1928 births
2014 deaths
Actresses from New York City
American film actresses
American people of English descent
American people of Russian-Jewish descent
American radio personalities
American stage actresses
American television actresses
American voice actresses
Dalton School alumni
Deaths from Alzheimer's disease
Deaths from dementia in New York (state)
Juilliard School faculty
People from Manhattan
Tony Award winners
20th-century American actresses
21st-century American actresses
Educators from New York City
American women educators
Women music educators
Kanin family
Special Tony Award recipients